John Pettersson (born 4 November 1968) is a Swedish boxer. He competed in the men's heavyweight event at the 1992 Summer Olympics.

References

External links
 

1968 births
Living people
Swedish male boxers
Olympic boxers of Sweden
Boxers at the 1992 Summer Olympics
Sportspeople from Västerås
Heavyweight boxers
20th-century Swedish people